Rajagopalachari is a popular given name used amongst the Iyengar community of Tamil Nadu

Some prominent people with the name are:
 C. Rajagopalachari, also known as Rajaji: Indian freedom fighter, Gandhian, leader of the Indian National Congress and founder of the Swatantra party.
 Sir Perungavur Rajagopalachari, Indian civil servant, Diwan of Cochin and later, Travancore and the first president of the Madras Legislative Council

References